Tuba Sounds is the debut album by tuba player Ray Draper recorded in 1957 and released on the Prestige label.

Reception

Scott Yanow of Allmusic reviewed the album, stating: "His solos are sometimes a touch awkward rhythmically and it takes one a little while to get used to his sound in this setting but, overall, this is a successful effort". The Penguin Guide to Jazz Recordings describes the album as “an impressive debut” for Draper, who was only 16 when it was recorded.

Track listing 
All compositions by Ray Draper except as indicated
 "Terry Anne" (Webster Young) - 6:39    
 "You're My Thrill" (Sidney Clare, Jay Gorney) - 6:48    
 "Pivot" (Mal Waldron) - 5:13    
 "Jackie's Dolly" - 4:54    
 "Mimi's Interlude" - 8:14    
 "House of Davis" (Webster Young) - 5:28

Personnel 
Ray Draper - tuba
Webster Young - trumpet 
Jackie McLean - alto saxophone 
Mal Waldron - piano
Spanky DeBrest - bass
Ben Dixon - drums

Production
Bob Weinstock - supervisor
Rudy Van Gelder - engineer

References 

Ray Draper albums
1957 debut albums
Prestige Records albums
Albums produced by Bob Weinstock
Albums recorded at Van Gelder Studio